Open Network Entertainment (ONE) is a joint venture between parent company LTI Global, Inc./ Locus Communications (a US-based marketer and distributor of prepaid products including phone cards) and Korean company PayLetter, Inc. (a service provider handling content related and micro-transaction billing processes). The company was created in 2009 with the stated mission of “providing value added services to online game publishers, retailers and gamers” through game cards available at retail stores and online.



Products

ONE Universal Power-Up Game Card

In October 2009, ONE announced the availability of its first product, the ONE Universal Power-Up Game Card, a prepaid game card that enables purchasers to play a variety of massively multiplayer online games  and purchase virtual goods within those games (micro-transactions). The cards are carried in Rite-Aid stores in North America   and are available in denominations of $10 and $20. Customers may add more currency to the card in order to maintain its use.

Games Playable using the ONE Power-Up Game Card

References

External links
 ONE Power-Up Game Card site
Video game companies of the United States